Enoxacin is an oral broad-spectrum fluoroquinolone antibacterial agent used in the treatment of urinary tract infections and gonorrhea. Insomnia is a common adverse effect. It is no longer available in the United States.

It has been shown recently that it may have cancer inhibiting effect.

Mechanism of action 
Quinolones and fluoroquinolones are bactericidal drugs, eradicating bacteria by interfering with DNA replication.
Like other fluoroquinolones, enoxacin functions by inhibiting bacterial DNA gyrase and topoisomerase IV. The inhibition of these enzymes prevents bacterial DNA replication, transcription, repair and recombination. Recently, it was shown that Enoxacin inhibits the expression of the microRNA mir-34-5p, leading to an increase in the lifespan of the nematode C. elegans.
Enoxacin is active against many Gram-positive bacteria. The quinolone is also active against Gram-negative bacteria

Pharmacokinetics 
After oral administration enoxacin is rapidly and well absorbed from the gastrointestinal tract. The antibiotic is widely distributed throughout the body and in the different biological tissues. Tissue concentrations often exceed serum concentrations. The binding of enoxacin to serum proteins is 35 to 40%.
The serum elimination half-life, in subjects with normal renal function, is approximately 6 hours. Approximately 60% of an orally administered dose is excreted in the urine as unchanged drug within 24 hours.
A small amount of a dose of drug administered is excreted in the bile. High concentrations of the fluoroquinolone are reached in the urinary tract and this fact ensures an antibacterial effect continued over time, particularly in this district.

Medical uses
Enoxacin can be used to treat a wide variety of infections, particularly gastroenteritis including infectious diarrhea, respiratory tract infections, gonorrhea and urinary tract infections.

Adverse effects 
Enoxacin, like other fluoroquinolones, is known to trigger seizures or lower the seizure threshold. The compound should not be administered to patients with epilepsy or a personal history of previous convulsive attacks as may promote the onset of these disorders.

Contraindications 
Enoxacin is contraindicated in subjects with a history of hypersensitivity to the substance or any other member of the quinolone class, or any component of the medicine. Enoxacin, like other fluoroquinolones, can cause degenerative changes in weightbearing joints of young animals. The compound should only be used in children
when the expected benefits are outweigh the risks.

Interactions 
 Fenbufen: co-administration with some quinolones, including enoxacin may increase the risk of seizures. For this reason, concomitant administration of fenbufen and the quinolone should be avoided, as a precaution.
 Theophylline: in patients treated concurrently with theophylline and enoxacin, concentrations of the methylxanthine in plasma arise due to a reduced metabolic clearance of theophylline.
 Ranitidine, sucralfate, antacids containing magnesium or aluminum, supplements containing calcium, iron, or zinc: co-administration with these substances can lead to therapeutic failure of the antibiotic due to decreased absorption by the intestinal tract. For example, magnesium or aluminum antacids turn enoxacin into insoluble salts that are not readily absorbed by the gastroenteric tract.

Notes

References

Further reading
.

External links
Medline entry

CYP1A2 inhibitors
Fluoroquinolone antibiotics
Withdrawn drugs
Naphthyridines
Piperazines
Carboxylic acids